DeShone Myles (born October 31, 1974) is a former American football linebacker.  He played professionally in the National Football League (NFL) for the Seattle Seahawks and the New Orleans Saints.  Myles played college football at the University of Nevada, Reno. He is the Nevada Wolf Pack's all-time leader in tackles with 528 and also owns four of the top six single season marks for tackles in team history. He was awarded the 1996 Big West Conference Defensive Player of the Year and is a member of Nevada's Team of the Century.  Myles failed to reach the same success in the NFL, playing in just 16 games over two seasons before being released due to a knee injury.
He is married and has 3 children. He resides in Las Vegas, Nevada  where he is a sergeant with the Las Vegas Metropolitan Police Department.

References

1974 births
Living people
American football linebackers
Nevada Wolf Pack football players
New Orleans Saints players
Seattle Seahawks players
Sportspeople from Las Vegas
Players of American football from Nevada